Rogersville is an unincorporated community and census-designated place (CDP) in Center Township, Greene County, Pennsylvania, United States. As of the 2010 census the population was 249.

References

External links

Census-designated places in Greene County, Pennsylvania
Census-designated places in Pennsylvania